Roberto Duete Fortes (born November 9, 1984) is an Angolan basketball player. Fortes is a member of the Angola national basketball team and formerly the Illinois State Redbirds men's basketball team. He represented Angola at the 2010 FIBA World Championship.

He is currently playing for Recreativo do Libolo at the Angolan major basketball league BIC Basket.

Personal
Fortes moved to the United States with his family at the age of 11, after leaving his native Angola to flee the Civil War. He also attended North Side High School in Fort Wayne, Indiana and Daytona State Community College prior to attending Illinois State.

References

1984 births
Living people
2010 FIBA World Championship players
2014 FIBA Basketball World Cup players
African Games gold medalists for Angola
African Games medalists in basketball
American people of Angolan descent
Angolan expatriate basketball people in the United States
Angolan men's basketball players
Atlético Petróleos de Luanda basketball players
Basketball players from Luanda
Competitors at the 2015 African Games
C.R.D. Libolo basketball players
Daytona State Falcons men's basketball players
Illinois State Redbirds men's basketball players
Power forwards (basketball)
Small forwards
Basketball players from Fort Wayne, Indiana